Gertrude Alice Meredith Williams (1877 – 3 March 1934), who generally went by the name of Alice Meredith Williams, was a British sculptor, painter, illustrator and stained glass designer.

Biography
Williams was born in Liverpool, the ninth of the ten surviving children of Dr David Williams (b. 1833), a surgeon, and his wife Sarah Bland. As a teenager she was privately tutored in still life and landscape painting by R. A. M. Stevenson, Professor of Fine Arts at Liverpool's University College. In her early twenties she won a scholarship to attend Liverpool School of Architecture and Fine Art, where she trained under Charles Allen and Robert Anning Bell. Here she was honed as an architectural sculptor. In 1900 she won a travelling scholarship from the City Council and move to Paris where she worked and studied for five years, attending the Académie Colarossi and learning from, among others,  Jean Antoine Injalbert, René Prinet, and Emmanuel Frémiet. It is said her work was also criticised positively by Auguste Rodin.

In 1902, in Paris, she met the artist Morris Meredith Williams, four years her junior. Having decided to marry, he left Paris in 1905 for a part-time job as drawing master at  Fettes College in Edinburgh. Alice moved temporarily back to Liverpool and lived with two of her sisters while seeking commissions and working, for a few months, for Harold Rathbone at the Della Robbia Pottery. She married Williams in 1906 and they moved into a flat at 27 Danube Street, Edinburgh. Three years later they crossed the road to a larger flat at no. 38.

From 1916 to 1919, while Morris was serving in the Army in France, Williams relocated to Peppard near Henley-upon-Thames. In 1929 she and her husband moved to Devon, renting North Wyke manor which lies between North Tawton and South Tawton.

From 1923 to 1932 she served as a ruling council member of the Cockburn Association, Edinburgh's influential conservation organisation.

Meredith Williams died of cancer in Devon on 3 March 1934. She is buried in the churchyard of St Andrew's in South Tawton, beneath a stone designed by her husband.

Work
Meredith Williams's memorial works include a war memorial for Queenstown, South Africa; the "Spirit of the Crusaders", a sculptural group for the Paisley War Memorial, designed by Sir Robert Lorimer; and a carved wooden reredos for St. James the Less Episcopal Church in Penicuik (1921). She also created twelve works for the Scottish National War Memorial at Edinburgh Castle (1927), including the figure of St. Michael hovering over the casket containing the names of the dead (carved by the Clow Brothers), and the frieze in the Shrine, designed by her husband Morris. She exhibited works at the Royal Scottish Academy and the Royal Academy of Arts.

References

Further reading

 Shaw, Phyllida (2018) Undaunted Spirit. The art and craft of Gertrude Alice Meredith Williams

External links

1877 births
1934 deaths
20th-century British sculptors
20th-century English painters
20th-century English women artists
Académie Colarossi alumni
Artists from Liverpool
British illustrators
English women painters
English women sculptors